Arun Chauhan (born 7 July 1996) is an Indian cricketer. He made his List A debut for Nagaland in the 2018–19 Vijay Hazare Trophy on 23 September 2018. He made his first-class debut for Nagaland in the 2018–19 Ranji Trophy on 22 December 2018.

References

External links
 

1996 births
Living people
Indian cricketers
Nagaland cricketers
Place of birth missing (living people)